The 9th annual Berlin International Film Festival was held from 26 June – 7 July 1959. The festival welcomed the cinematic movement known as the New Wave and screened the work of directors such as Jean-Luc Godard, Agnès Varda and François Truffaut. The Golden Bear was awarded to the French film Les Cousins directed by Claude Chabrol.

Jury
The following people were announced as being on the jury for the festival:

International feature film jury
 Robert Aldrich, director (United States) - Jury President
 Johan Jacobsen, director, screenwriter and producer (Denmark)
 Charles Ford, writer and filmmaker (France)
 John Bryan, production designer (United Kingdom)
 Ignazio Tranquilli, writer and playwright (Italy)
 Shigeo Miyata, painter and physician (Japan)
 Wali Eddine Sameh, director (United Arab Emirates)
 O. E. Hasse, actor (West Germany)
 Gerhard Prager, writer and producer (West Germany)
 Fritz Podehl, producer (West Germany)
 Walther Schmieding, journalist (West Germany)

International documentary and short jury
 Curt Oertel, director and director of photography (West Germany) - Jury President
 M.D. Bath (India)
 Hans Cürlis, director (West Germany)
 Paul Davay, film critic (Belgium)
 Odd Hølaas, journalist and writer (Norway)
 Katina Paxinou, actress (Greece)
 Alfonso Sánchez Martínez, journalist and film critic (Spain)

Films in competition
The following films were in competition for the Golden Bear award:

Key
{| class="wikitable" width="550" colspan="1"
| style="background:#FFDEAD;" align="center"| †
|Winner of the main award for best film in its section
|}

Awards
The following prizes were awarded by the Jury:

International jury awards
 Golden Bear: Les Cousins by Claude Chabrol
 Silver Bear for Best Director: Akira Kurosawa for Kakushi-toride no san-akunin
 Silver Bear for Best Actress: Shirley MacLaine for Ask Any Girl
 Silver Bear for Best Actor: Jean Gabin for Archimède le clochard
 Silver Bear Extraordinary Jury Prize: Hayley Mills for Tiger Bay

Documentaries and short films jury awards
 Golden Bear (Documentaries): White Wilderness by James Algar
 Short Film Golden Bear: Prijs de zee by Herman van der Horsti
 Silver Bear for Best Short Film: ex aequoDas Knalleidoskop by Herbert HungerRadha and Krishna by J. S. Bhownagary
 Silver Bear Extraordinary Jury Prize (Short film): Hest på sommerferie by Astrid Henning-Jensen
 Recognition of honor (Short Film): I ditteri by Alberto Ancilotto

Independent jury awards
FIPRESCI Award
Kakushi toride no san akunin by Akira Kurosawa
OCIC Award
Paradies und Feuerofen by Victor Herbert
Youth Film Award (Jugendfilmpreis):
Best Feature Film Suitable for Young People: Hadaka no taiyō by Miyoji Ieki
Best Documentary Film Suitable for Young People: Paradies und Feuerofen by Herbert Viktor
Best Short Film Suitable for Young People: Anneaux d'or by René Vautier

References

External links
 9th Berlin International Film Festival 1959
 1959 Berlin International Film Festival
 Berlin International Film Festival:1959  at Internet Movie Database

09
1959 film festivals
1959 in West Germany
1950s in Berlin